Francis Burrill (30 August 1892–1962) was an English footballer who played in the Football League for Charlton Athletic, Walsall and Wolverhampton Wanderers. At Wolves, Burrill played in the 1921 FA Cup Final where they lost to Tottenham Hotspur.

References

1892 births
1962 deaths
English footballers
Association football forwards
English Football League players
West Ham United F.C. players
Southend United F.C. players
Wolverhampton Wanderers F.C. players
Charlton Athletic F.C. players
Walsall F.C. players